Merbaka, but officially Agia Trias (Αγία Τρίας, "Holy Trinity"), is a village in the province of Argolis, in the Peloponnese near Argos, Greece. It was officially renamed on December 29, 1953

Merbaka is thought to have been named for William of Moerbeke, a 13th-century Roman Catholic archbishop of Corinth, scholar and Philhellene from Flanders.  A roughly contemporaneous Byzantine-Gothic Church of the Dormition of the Mother of God (popularly known as Παναγία της Βούζης, Panagia tis Bouzis, "Our Lady of Bouzis") in the village may have been built under his auspices. The church's popular name is held to have come from a prominent Lemnian family of landowners who donated the land for a mediaeval monastery nearby; their name and social position is attested by contemporaneous documents with the seal of Michael Makrembolites Doukas. The monastery was sited further inland from its existing twin, the Monastery of Areias near Nafplio – popularly known as "The Holy Mountain" — to protect the monks and ecclesiastical property from piratical raiding.

Merbaka's official name likely stems from the inclusion of three "saints" on a re-used Classical pediment on the thirteenth-century church: villagers likely interpreted these figures as a representation of the Holy Trinity, and unofficially renamed the church to reflect this; in time, the name was applied to the new church, and later, to the village itself. The older church includes other recycled antiquities like a Roman dedication, in Latin, to Quintus Caecilius Metellus Creticus, a Roman proconsul in Greece who was noted for his suppression of piracy.
From the end of the Sixth Ottoman-Venetian War to 1770, when it was attacked by bandits, Argos was the seat of the Orthodox Metropolis of Nauplion and Argolis, due to the Venetian imposition of a Latin bishop at Argos.

The modern church of the Holy Trinity, first erected in 1898, was torn down and rebuilt in 1934.  A plaque on the front of the belltower says that the clock was donated in 1952.

Merbaka is part of the municipal unit of Midea.  According to the 2001 Greek census, the village had a population of 1,267 inhabitants.

Notable people
Theofanis Tombras - former general manager of OTE and alleged participant in the "Koskotas scandal", for which he was acquitted

References

Populated places in Argolis
Villages in Greece